Waad Al Bahri is a Syrian who participated in SuperStar (Arabic TV series) and reached the finals of the program. She is also a singer and has produced one album.

Early life
Bahri started singing at the age of four. She sang at many occasions and festivals and sang all the songs of the series Asmahan. She titled her first album "Agayer Hayaty". She then appeared in a video clip for a song from the album as the "Tagreba".

Education and career
Bahri received a bachelor's degree in business administration and currently resides in both Abu Dhabi, where her family lives, and Cairo, where she is active artistically and visits the many concerts and festivals. The most important of these are held at the Cairo Opera House, where she sang several times. She also participated in the Arab Song Festival, sung with Sayed Darwish in Alexandria, participated in the national celebrations of Libya, and participated in the music festival in the Damascus Opera House.

Albums 
 Aghayer Hayati

References

1981 births
Living people
21st-century Syrian women singers
People from as-Suwayda
Idols (franchise) participants
Contestants from Arabic singing competitions
Syrian people of Lebanese descent